The Rochester Industrial and Rapid Transit Railway , more commonly known as the  Rochester subway, was a light rail rapid transit line in the city of Rochester, New York, from 1927 to 1956. The subway was constructed in the bed of the old Erie Canal, which allowed the route to be grade-separated for its entire length.  of the route through downtown were constructed in a cut-and-cover tunnel that became Broad Street, and the only underground portion of the subway. The Rochester Subway was designed to reduce interurban traffic on city streets, and to facilitate freight interchange between the railroads. The line was operated on a contract basis by New York State Railways until Rochester Transit Corporation (RTC) took over in 1938. The last day of passenger service was June 30, 1956. Portions of the right-of-way were used for expressway construction, while the rest was abandoned and filled in over the years. The largest remaining section is a stretch of tunnel under Broad Street from Exchange Street to the intersection of Court Street and South Avenue.

History

Construction 
Planning for the construction of a subway in Rochester began around 1910 as the Erie Canal was re-routed from downtown Rochester to pass south of the city. The plans were supported by a feasibility study from engineer George F. Swain and promoted by Mayor Hiram Edgerton and other civic leaders. In 1918, the new canal route was completed, and in 1919 the abandoned portion of the canal was bought by the city to serve as the route of the subway. It was believed the subway would provide several benefits to the city. In addition to providing a cross-town commute to residents in the northwest and southeast of the city, the railroad would double as a belt line connecting the five freight railroads that then ran through Rochester, which were previously disconnected. Interurban trolleys would also be routed into the subway to reduce traffic congestion on the surface streets. Construction was approved by the city council on November 22, 1921, and began in May 1922. The project had universal approval from Rochester's newspapers, chamber of commerce, and labor unions.

In the city center, a tunnel was dug with a new street, Broad Street, located above. Only  were in the tunnel, with the rest of the route in open cut. The term "subway" did not refer to the tunnel, but to the route being grade-separated and operated as rapid transit. The segment over the Genesee River utilized the former Second Genesee Aqueduct. The subway's construction encountered several delays as more rock needed to be excavated than anticipated, and it was not completed until 1927. The construction bonds would not be paid off until 1960, after the subway had closed, at a cost of over $19 million to the city.

New York State Railways (1927–1938) 

Operations began on December 1, 1927 under contract with New York State Railways. Ten former Utica and Mohawk Valley Railway 2000-series cars were transferred from the Utica Lines to provide dedicated service in the Rochester subway. Freight service was provided by an electric locomotive purchased from General Electric.

Interurban railways began using the new subway almost immediately, and were later joined by freight railroads. Starting on the first day of operations in 1927, the Rochester and Eastern Rapid Railway connected at Rowlands and terminated at City Hall station. The Rochester and Syracuse Railroad began using the subway in 1928, using a new connection established just east of Winton Road station. The Rochester, Lockport and Buffalo Railroad entered from the west side starting in 1928 using a ramp constructed at Lyell Avenue. These latter two ramps were also used by the New York Central Railroad for freight traffic. The Baltimore and Ohio Railroad connected to the subway with a ramp along Broad Street, and the Lehigh Valley Railroad connected at the Court Street Station.

In 1929, a special subway–surface operation began using a ramp at Emerson station to connect with the Dewey Avenue line to provide rush-hour service to Kodak Park, a major employer in the city. On June 1, 1929, local service on the Rochester subway was extended from Winton Road to Rowlands loop. 

In the aftermath of the Great Depression, New York State Railways fell into bankruptcy along with other railroads that operated interurban lines in the area. By 1931, all of the connecting interurban railways had ceased operation leaving the subway as an east–west line with no rail connections outside the line. While the company was in receivership, New York State Railways continued to operate the subway on a contract basis with the city of Rochester. Public opinion of the subway turned negative due to low ridership.

Rochester Transit Corp. (1938–1956) 
The former Rochester Lines of New York State Railways were reorganized as the Rochester Transit Corporation on August 2, 1938, and operation of the subway was transferred to the new company. On the same day, the 2000-series cars were replaced with newer and faster 46-series steel cars acquired from the abandoned Utica & Mohawk Valley Railway in 1937. Harold S. W. MacFarlin, the city commerce commissioner, believed that the subway could be saved by faster and expanded service and promoted plans to extend the subway line. 

During World War II, wartime rationing made the subway popular once again, and annual ridership peaked at over 5 million in 1946 and 1947. Proposals to extend the line were briefly considered in the press, but ridership began declining again in 1948, and the city council made plans to abandon the subway and use its route for a connecting highway to the New York State Thruway instead.

In an effort to cut costs, weekday service was reduced and Sunday service was eliminated in 1952. The service contract was awarded on a month-to-month basis until the city council voted in 1955 to end all subway service on June 30, 1956. Freight service was operated by RTC until September 1, 1957, when the remaining rail operations were turned over to the connecting New York Central (NYC) and Baltimore and Ohio (B&O) railroads.

Expressways and freight (1956–1996) 
The subway bed from Court Street to Winton Road was used for the construction of a portion of the Eastern Expressway (I-490) in 1959, with the section from Winton Road to Rowlands used for I-590. Limited freight service operated by connecting railroads lasted on the western portion of the subway route from Court Street to General Motors until 1976, when the city of Rochester elected to fill the cut to eliminate maintenance on the numerous bridges. Rail freight deliveries in the subway tunnel continued until 1996, when Gannett Newspapers moved its printing operations from the Gannett Building which the subway ran under to another location. Capelli Sport Stadium was constructed on a portion of the filled-in cut in 2006.

Salvage and preservation

In 1976, after the announcement of the fill, the City of Rochester allowed the New York Museum of Transportation to collect the rail from the portion of the line being filled. The former rail is still in use by the museum. In 2010, when the city decided to fill the portion of the tunnel between Brown and the B&O ramp, the museum was allowed to collect the remaining rail, surviving switches and other railroad fixtures from the tunnel.

Rochester subway car 60 is at the Rochester and Genesee Valley Railroad Museum, where it has been undergoing restoration since 2016. Built in 1916 for Utica Railways and moved to Rochester in 1936, it is the only surviving example from the 12-car fleet that served the subway. Car 60 was set aside for preservation in 1956, and was donated to the Rochester Chapter of the National Railway Historical Society. The trolley car was loaned to other organizations and returned to the Rochester & Genesee Valley Railroad Museum in 1998, prior to restoration. Locomotive L-2 was rescued from a Rochester scrap yard in the 1970s, and has been set aside for a potential future restoration by the New York Museum of Transportation.

Rolling stock

Revenue equipment
L-1 locomotive 1200V General Electric electric locomotive – 1928
L-2 locomotive – Plymouth Locomotive Works of Plymouth, Ohio – 1937
46–70* Cincinnati Car Company SE Interurban Cars 1916 – all steel cars; acquired 1937
2000–2018* J.G. Brill SE Interurban Cars 1902 – wood cars built as trailers and converted to motors; acquired 1927
* Even numbers only.

Work fleet
014 Single-truck rotary plow
0105 Jackson & Sharp Line car
0200 Single-cab motor Differential flat-car
0205 locomotive – Jewett Car Company of Newark, Ohio – 1903
0214 Single-cab flat motor car
0220 Single-cab Differential dump car
0330 Differential dump car trailer
0331 Differential dump car trailer
0343 Work and tool car
2002 Flatcar trailer
2006 Flatcar trailer

Facilities
Main Street Shops (until 1941)
General Motors Carbarn (built 1941)

Future of the tunnel

The property of the abandoned subway tunnel belongs to the city of Rochester. In recent decades, city officials have considered several plans to fill or renovate the tunnel. Maintenance of the tunnel cost the city $1.2 million in 2007. 

There were proposals to use some of the tunnels in a new rapid transit system. Another proposal was to transform the Broad Street Aqueduct into an underground walkway connecting the Rochester Riverside Convention Center with the Blue Cross Arena. A component of this walkway would include a Rochester Transportation Museum. Some suggested filling the remaining subway tunnel with water, re-routing the Erie Canal and restoring the aqueduct to its original purpose.

In 2004, Rochester city officials decided to fill the remaining subway tunnel with earth. This decision caused public outcry, since residents regard the subway as part of their history.

On June 15, 2006, the city promised to form a committee to investigate all possible options. In July 2008, the city voted to fill in a portion of the tunnel, citing safety concerns. The westernmost end of the tunnel was filled as part of the Broad Street Tunnel Improvement project. Work began in spring 2010 at a cost between $14 and $16 million. The city removed the Broad Street section from East Main to Brown Street and filled that section of the subway tunnel, but rebuilt the former B&O ramp into what remains of the subway, making that ramp the western access point into the subway. The remains of the Rochester Subway run from the B&O ramp just east of East Main Street to Court Street.

In 2009, The City released a comprehensive community based study entitled “Masterplan for the Broad Street Corridor and the Historic Erie Canal Aqueduct. The $1.2M Federally sponsored study was the result of extensive meetings with the community, business, planners, advocacy groups and downtown developers. At the heart of the study was a desire to develop the Aqueduct and surrounding district in such a manner that supports downtown development and serves as a source of community pride. After over a hundred meetings, the consensus was to re-water the Aqueduct and create Rochester’s Historic Canal District. 

The plan was endorsed by elected officials, a majority of Rochester citizens (73%), and numerous business leaders. The plan received the highest award (platinum)by the American Planning Association along with numerous distinguished accolades from AIA, ACEC and was voted “Rochester’s Best Idea” by the readers of City Newspaper. 

In 2017, the site of Court Street station was demolished to make way for a mixed-use commercial and luxury residential highrise eliminating the Court Street tunnel entrance. The city maintains a maintenance doorway underneath the Gannett Building. This entrance is not open to the public.

In 2018, a plan dubbed ROC the Riverway was unveiled that proposes removing the Broad Street level of the aqueduct and partially re-flooding the former canal and subway bed on the aqueduct with water similar to what was done with the historic canals at Canalside in Buffalo, NY and incorporate walkways to connect the nearby Blue Cross Arena with the nearby convention center. The project moved to the planning and construction phase in 2022.

Also in 2018, the city solicited bids to turn a remaining segment of tunnel between Main Street and Exchange Street into underground parking. There were no interested buyers.

See also 
 Cincinnati Subway
 Detroit-Superior underground subway in Cleveland

References

Further Reading

External links

"The End of the Line" – a documentary about the Rochester Subway.
Car 60 at the Rochester & Genesee Valley Railroad Museum
RocWiki: Abandoned Subway

Rochester Subway
Defunct New York (state) railroads
Transportation in Rochester, New York
Light rail in New York (state)
Defunct public transport operators in the United States
Underground rapid transit in the United States